József Navarrete (born 16 December 1965) is a Hungarian fencer, who won a silver medal in the team sabre competition at the 1996 Summer Olympics in Atlanta together with Bence Szabó and Csaba Köves.

References

External links

1965 births
Living people
Hungarian male sabre fencers
Fencers at the 1996 Summer Olympics
Olympic fencers of Hungary
Olympic silver medalists for Hungary
Olympic medalists in fencing
Medalists at the 1996 Summer Olympics